Keiller da Silva Nunes (born 29 October 1996), simply known as Keiller, is a Brazilian professional footballer who plays as a goalkeeper for Internacional.

Club career
Keiller made his debut in the professional team of Internacional in the 2nd Semi-Final match of 2017 Campeonato Gaúcho, replacing the injured Marcelo Lomba, against Caxias. In the penalty shootouts, Keiller defended two charges, classifying the Internacional for the Final.

Keiller also played the 1st game of the Final, against Novo Hamburgo.

On 2021, Keiller was loaned to Chapecoense for the whole season.

On 2022, Keiller returned to Inter, becoming the first-choice goalkeeper by the end of the same year in the place of the injured Daniel.

References

External links

1996 births
Living people
Sportspeople from Rio Grande do Sul
Brazilian footballers
Association football goalkeepers
Campeonato Brasileiro Série A players
Sport Club Internacional players
Associação Chapecoense de Futebol players